Sarika Siva Prasad (born 7 November 1959) is an Indian international cricket umpire based in Singapore. He also officiated five matches during the 2009 Women's Cricket World Cup, including the 3rd Place Playoff match. Prasad was born in Visakhapatnam, India.

In January 2022, he was named as one of the on-field umpires for the 2022 ICC Under-19 Cricket World Cup in the West Indies.

See also
 List of One Day International cricket umpires
 List of Twenty20 International cricket umpires

References

External links

1959 births
Living people
Indian cricket umpires
Cricketers from Visakhapatnam
Singaporean One Day International cricket umpires
Singaporean Twenty20 International cricket umpires
Indian emigrants to Singapore
Singaporean cricket umpires